Legoland California Resort is a theme park, miniature park, and aquarium located in Carlsbad, California, based on the Lego toy brand. Opening on March 20, 1999, it was the third Legoland park to open and the first outside of Europe. The park is currently owned by Merlin Entertainments, which took a controlling interest in 2005. A second park in the United States, Legoland Florida, opened in 2011. A third park, Legoland New York, opened in May 2021.

Resort
The Legoland California Resort currently encompasses:
 The original park (opened in March 1999)
 A Lego-themed Sea Life Aquarium (opened in August 2008), the first Sea Life in the United States
 A Lego-themed water park (opened in May 2010)
 A Lego Chima expansion to the water park (opened in 2014)

The resort site includes two hotels:
 Legoland Resort Hotel (250 rooms, opened in April 2013)
 Legoland Castle Hotel (250 rooms, opened in April 2018)

History
Lego opened the first Legoland theme park in Billund, Denmark in 1968, followed by a second park in Windsor, England in 1996. The Carlsbad park was the third to open, in March 1999. At the time, Lego was considering an additional United States Legoland to be located somewhere on the east coast. When the park opened, there were eight themed areas. Starting at the entrance (at the central southern part of the park) and proceeding clockwise, they were:

 The Beginning (park entrance and gift shop)
 Village Green (including Playtown for toddlers)
 The Ridge
 Fun Town
 The Garden
 Miniland (including The Lake in the center of the park)
 Castle Hill
 Imagination Zone

By 2002, Village Green and The Ridge had been combined into an area called Explore Village and the Aquazone and LEGO Technic Test Track rides had been installed at Imagination Zone. The fourth Legoland, built in Germany, opened in 2002. Dino Island and Coastersaurus opened in April 2004; the park also added Fun Town Fire Academy, a Florida-themed Miniland area, and the Block of Fame for its fifth anniversary.

Legoland California installed the first KUKA RoboCoaster in the United States in 2005. However, the weak retail toy market led to the sale of the four Legoland theme parks in July 2005 for $456 million to Blackstone Capital Partners, a private equity firm based in the United States. Blackstone had previously purchased Merlin in May 2005, which owned the Sea Life Centres and London Dungeon; the two assets were combined as Merlin Entertainments, with Lego taking a 30% ownership share in the combined Merlin Entertainments. Collectively, the four theme parks had approximately 5 million visitors per year at the time.

Under Merlin, Legoland California would add Pirate Shores (2006), a Las Vegas-themed Miniland area (2007), the Egyptian explorer-themed Land of Adventure (2008), and the  Legoland Water Park (2010). In 2009, Merlin requested permission to develop an onsite Lego-themed hotel in the existing parking lot; permission was granted in October and plans for the 250-room hotel were announced in 2011, making the site a resort in 2013. The first fictional Miniland area, themed with scenes from the six (at the time) Star Wars movies and the Clone Wars television series, opened in March 2011. The water park was expanded in 2014 with a Chima-themed area. A second 250-room hotel with a castle theme was added in 2018.

Attendance at Legoland California reached 2.5 million visitors in 2013 and nearly 3 million by 2015, nearly double the attendance of Legoland Florida. More than $20 million was spent per year on sales tax on food and merchandise. The park employed more than 2200 workers in total: 600 full-time, nearly 500 part-time, and more than 1100 seasonal.

In mid-March 2020, in line with other Legoland parks, the park was indefinitely shut down because of the COVID-19 pandemic and reopened on April 1, 2021.

Theme park

Explorer Island

Explorer Island is a section with themes of dinosaurs and exploration. It contains a large sand area where children may dig for "fossils" and the Gerstlauer-built Coastersaurus mini steel roller coaster, a close copy of the Legoland Germany junior coaster Drachenjagd, with a ride duration of approximately 2 minutes. It was installed in 2004 by Ride Entertainment Group, who handles all of Gerstlauer's operations in the Western Hemisphere.

Explorer Island was previously named Dino Island. When the Village Green/Explore Village area was taken over by Heartlake City, the Fairy Tale Brook boat ride and Safari Trek on-rail driving ride (originally a walking trail showing life-size African animals built with LEGO bricks) were counted as part of the renamed Explorer Island. These rides date back to the opening of the park.

LEGO Friends Heartlake City

The Heartlake City section, which opened on May 21, 2015, is based on the LEGO Friends brand marketed to girls. The area features Heartlake Fountain, a water play area; Friends Forever Stage, where musical performances occur; Heartlake Stables, a play area and building zone; and Mia's Riding Camp, a carousel.

Heartlake City replaced Duplo Village, which included a set of musical fountains and water features collectively called the "Water Works". A temporary installation of the sets from The Lego Movie opened in 2014 at Duplo Village.

"DUPLO Playtown", a play area for little kids, and "LEGOLAND Express", a mini locomotive ride through the Playtown used to be in the Duplo Village/Heartlake City area. When Heartlake City opened, "DUPLO Playtown" and "LEGOLAND Express" became part of the nearby area, Fun Town. On May 9, 2019, DUPLO Playtown reopened in the queue of the Kid Power Tower. In that same year, Heartlake City was removed and replaced with a Lego Movie themed area.

Fun Town

Fun Town is a role-playing amusement area where guests simulate adult skills or professional identities, such as driving cars, steering boats, or fighting fires.

Miniland USA

Miniland USA is a 1:20 scale model miniature park featuring prominent architecture and symbols from seven areas in the United States. Certain models are visible throughout the Legoland park. It was constructed over the course of three years using more than 20 million LEGO bricks. The Coast Cruise ride, which departs from Miniland USA, travels through the lake in the center of Legoland.

Miniland includes the Model Shop, the main design and building office for Legoland's US parks. A large viewing window allows guests to watch master model builders working on new models. Repairs and refurbishment of existing models are also conducted in the Model Shop.

Certain model builders have inserted incongruous scenes into the Miniland vignettes, including a businessman mooning the presidential motorcade and a man using the toilet in the Grand Central Station model. Miniland officials insist all such scenes are incorporated with full management knowledge and approval.

The Star Wars-themed Miniland was expanded with a life-size model of an X-wing starfighter, on display in 2013. A large-scale model of the Death Star was added in 2015, along with a recreation of the trench run scene from the climax of Episode IV.

On January 6, 2020, Star Wars Miniland closed permanently.

Castle Hill

Castle Hill is a medieval castle-themed area. The area includes two coasters and a wooden playground for little kids.

In 2005, Legoland opened the Wild Woods Golf putting course decorated with off-green LEGO models on the west side of Castle Hill. Wild Woods Golf and the neighboring Enchanted Walk were replaced by the submarine ride LEGO City: Deep Sea Adventure, which opened in July 2018.

Imagination Zone

In the Imagination Zone, visitors can ride a Wild Mouse-style roller coaster called the Technic Coaster-Test Track (formerly named Project X), Bionicle Blaster (a variant of a teacup ride). Kids can also build and race Lego cars down a ramp at Build 'n Test (younger children have a similar build and play area in the same building, named Duplo Play), play LEGO PC games at the Maniac Challenge (later converted to consoles and renamed the Xbox Family Gamespace after its corporate sponsor), and program robots in Mindstorms. At the park's opening in 1999, the Imagination Zone only referred to the Maniac Challenge/Mindstorms and Build & Test/Duplo Play buildings; the other rides had not yet been built. The Maniac Challenge/Mindstorms building was distinguished by large LEGO models of Albert Einstein's head, a submarine, and a Technic Tyrannosaurus rex.

The LEGO Show Place theater screens 4-D films. In the initial incarnation, the movie was interactive and the audience could decide the ending. Later, more movies were added, including Bob the Builder  and Clutch Powers (a racing movie). Racers 4-D began alternating with the new Spellbreaker 4-D film in May 2006. Bob the Builder In 4-D: Bob the Builder and the Roller Coaster was added in March 2009. The Legends of Chima debuted on March 7, 2014. The LEGO® Movie™ 4D A New Adventure was added to Legoland California on February 6, 2016. LEGO® NINJAGO® - Master of the 4th Dimension opened on January 12, 2018. LEGO City 4D - Officer in Pursuit! was added on April 12, 2019.

In February 2019, sets from The Lego Movie 2 were installed in the Imagination Zone.

Pirate Shores

Pirate Shores is a splash park with water-oriented rides and attractions. This area was added in 2006, and Captain Cranky's Challenge was added in May 2007.

Land of Adventure

This section is designed to replicate the 1920s in Egypt, drawing inspiration from the LEGO Adventurers line (Egypt sub-theme). Land of Adventure opened in March 2008.

LEGO Ninjago World
The Lego Ninjago World opened in May 2016. The area features Ninjago: The Ride along with new retail and dining options. Ninjago: The Ride is controlled by hand motions using "Maestro" technology developed by Triotech, who had previously developed the interactive Voyage to the Iron Reef dark ride at Knott's Berry Farm. This area also features Ninjago Training Camp, a playground that opened in December 2022.

Retired rides and attractions

The Lego Movie World 
In Spring 2020, LEGOLAND California Resort was scheduled to open their biggest addition in the history of the park, The Lego Movie World. The opening was delayed until May 27, 2021, due to the COVID-19 pandemic. The area features Emmet's Flying Adventure - Masters of Flight, a flying theatre attraction (similar to Soarin' at EPCOT and Disney California Adventure). Unlike Florida and Billund, this version will include two theatres rather than one. This area will also feature Unikitty's Disco Drop, a drop attraction where riders seated in four pairs raise, drop, and spin around a pole. It features two towers. There is also a carrousel called Queen Watevra's Carrousel, from LEGO Friends Heartlake City. Additionally, there is also a build area, Build Watevra You Wa'Na Build, and small playground, Benny's Playship, with two tall twisty slides that look like a rocket. There is also a splash pad with fountains, a convenience store, three dining locations, Everything is Ramen (a ramen quick service location), Cloud Cuckoo Crêpes (a crêpe stand), and Benny's Rocket Fuel (basic food stand with popcorn and pretzels).

Sea Life Aquarium

The first Sea Life Aquarium in North America opened at Legoland California in August 2008.

Water Park

This is a water park area in Legoland California. Planning for the water park began in September 2009, and it opened on May 28, 2010. It is located next to the buildings in Fun Town, meaning admission to the water park is an extra cost ticket in addition to regular park admission.

It is the first Legoland to feature a water park; a Legoland Water Park opened in Florida in 2012. At Legoland California, a Legends of Chima-themed expansion to the water park opened in early July 2014.

References

External links

 
  Satellite image from Google Maps
 William Webb's New York Photo Gallery

Legoland
Amusement parks in California
1999 establishments in California
Buildings and structures in San Diego County, California
Tourist attractions in San Diego County, California
Carlsbad, California
Amusement parks opened in 1999